Aguilar de Campos is a municipality located in the province of Valladolid, Castile and León, Spain. According to the 2004 census (INE), the municipality has a population of 337 inhabitants.

Notable people
Belarmino Tomás (1892–1950), socialist politician

References 

Municipalities in the Province of Valladolid